The Dweller in High Places was broadcast on BBC 7's The 7th Dimension program as part of the Blood Lines series.  It was broadcast on 26 February 2007 at 18:30 GMT. An original tale by award-winning author Susanna Clarke, it was narrated by Georgina Hagen.

Premise

Across the water, the Napoleonic Wars raged but a young girl is about to discover a danger much closer to home.

Plot

The protagonist, Lucy Manners, is a 12-year-old girl who has been sent to Mrs Hackett's School on Titchfield Street, London.  After encountering several unpleasant fellow students, Lucy discovers the Greek Sphinx in the school's attic.  The two become fast friends, sharing conversations, despite the Sphinx's quarrelsome nature.

Lucy soon discovers that the Sphinx, considering herself a blight upon man, has come to London to query men with riddles and, when they fail to answer correctly, to strangle them.  In order to prevent this massacre, Lucy opts to be the first person to attempt to answer a riddle, which she does correctly.

BBC Radio 4 Extra programmes
British radio dramas